Michele Marie Bumgarner (born September 2, 1989 in Mandaluyong) is a Filipina racing driver. She was born to an American father and a Filipina mother. She made her debut into single seater racing with the National Karting Series in the Philippines in 1999 at the age of 10. She has participated in the Asia-Pacific Karting Championships Japan, Shell Super Karting Series, Asian Karting Open Championship (AKOC), and the Italian Masters Series.

In 2006 Bumgarner made her auto racing debut driving in the Asian Formula Three Championship, finishing third in the series' Promotion Class.

She competed in the first five rounds of the 2008 Star Mazda Championship season for John Walko Racing. Her best finish was 15th place coming in her final start at Portland International Raceway.

On September 19, 2008, she became the first female champion of the Rock Island Grand Prix in Rock Island, Illinois, the world’s largest street karting race. The 7th foreign-born winner in its 14-year history, Michele steered the Margay Team to a 1-2-3-4 finish with 11 minutes and 24.144 seconds. She said: “This will stick with me my whole career. Everyone goes on about how great this race is and it’s special that this is my first time here and my first win here. I hope to come back.”
On September 6, 2009 she successfully defended that title in a three kart battle.

In November 2008 it was announced that Bumgarner had signed a driver development contract to race in the Firestone Indy Lights series with Walker Racing. She participated in a test with Guthrie Racing However, Walker Racing entered the 2009 Indy Lights season fielding a car for Stefan Wilson rather than Bumgarner and as of 2011 she has not driven in an Indy Lights race and she has not participated in a professional auto race since 2008.

In September 2013, Michele announced that she will join the Mazda Road to Indy program with World Speed Motorsports, to which she made two starts in the Pro Mazda Championship Presented by Cooper Tires at Houston, claiming a top-10 finish and earning the Quarter Master Hard Charger Award for most positions gained in the race.

In 2014, Michelle joined the Pro Mazda Championship  full-time, racing for World Speed Motorsports Team.

Motorsport distinctions

 2013 Quarter Master Hard Charger Award for most positions gained in the race, during the Pro Mazda Championship round in Houston
 2009 Won TaG Senior Class at Rock Island Grand Prix, for second straight year and finished third in WKA TaG Championship
 2008 Won TaG Senior Class at Rock Island Grand Prix, the first female winner
Selected for 2005 BMW Scholarship Award by Formula BMW Racing School in Bahrain
2004 Overall Champion Asian Karting Zone Championship for Open Class
2004 Runner-Up for Super Series Karting Philippines Open Class
2004 Recipient of GOLDEN WHEEL for Motorsports Driver of the Year
2004 Runner-Up for Formula Toyota Championships BRC
2004 Automobile Association of the Philippines Motorsports Award
2004 Philippines Sportswriters' Association Citation for Karting
2003 Karter of the Year, Philippines
2003 Motorsports Driver of the Year, Philippines
2003 Asian Intercontinental Junior Karting Champion

Pro Mazda Championship

External links
Official site

References

1989 births
Filipino racing drivers
Filipino female racing drivers
Asian Formula Three Championship drivers
Indy Pro 2000 Championship drivers
Filipino people of American descent
Filipino people of German descent
People from Mandaluyong
Sportspeople from Metro Manila
Living people